Mark Esposito is a Swiss economist, has been serving as a professor at universities and business schools such as Harvard University, Hult International Business School, and Arizona State University. Esposito was appointed a fellow of the Mohammed bin Rashid School of Government in Dubai in 2017 and as a global expert for the World Economic Forum.

Early life and education

Esposito grew up between Italy, the United States and Canada. He returned to Italy to gain both his BA and MA in human and social studies from the University of Turin, before moving again to the United States, where he resides in Boston. He completed his education with a doctoral degree in business and economics from the International School of Management in Paris, on a joint program with St. John’s University in New York City. He received post-doctorate education at Harvard Business School. In 2015, Esposito became a candidate to the Executive Doctorate of Business Administration at the École des Ponts ParisTech and its business school, which he defended in February 2018.

Career

Esposito is a socio-economist who teaches systems thinking, business, government and society, modern dilemmas, and economic and strategic competitiveness at the Harvard Extension School and Harvard Summer School.

The Lab-Center for Competitiveness at Grenoble Ecole de Management, which he founded in 2009, studies competitiveness as a foundation for creating sustainable businesses, nations and societies, as well as the creation of equality in society. Their work involves researching and analysing the nature of competition and its implications in a range of contexts, and applying their research through the production of case studies. The Lab Centre is a member of the Microeconomics of Competitiveness Affiliate Network, originally developed by Michael E. Porter.

As an agenda contributor on the World Economic Forum, Esposito regularly contributes papers exploring the interplay between economics, business and society, the most recent of which offered a balanced perspective on the ongoing debate around artificial intelligence, the increasing automation of jobs, and the realistic implications for global employment.

In 2016, Esposito was appointed as research fellow at the Circular Economy Research Initiative at the Judge Business School, University of Cambridge.

Fast-expanding markets is a concept Esposito co-created with his long-term collaborators Terence Tse and Khaled Soufani (of the Judge Business School at the University of Cambridge).

Publications 
  with Timi Ecimovic, Lloyd Williams, and Roger Haw
  
 
  with Lloyd Williams and Alessandro Biscaccianti
  with Timi Ecimovic, Matjaz Mulej, and Roger Haw 
  with Alessandro Cavelzani 
  with Timi Ecimovic, Matjaz Mulej, and Roger Haw
   with Patrick O'Sullivan and Mark Smith
  with Patrick O'Sullivan and Nigel F. B. Allington
  with Terence Tse 
  with Ifedapo Adeleye
  with Terence Tse and Danny Goh

Recognitions 
Esposito was shortlisted for the Thinkers50 Breakthrough Idea Award in 2017 (through the DRIVE framework he co-created with Terence Tse).

References

External links 

Harvard University profile

 Swiss academics
Living people
Year of birth missing (living people)
Harvard University faculty
Hult International Business School faculty
Arizona State University faculty